Louis Bayard (born November 30, 1963, in Albuquerque, New Mexico) is an American author. His historical mysteries include The Pale Blue Eye, Mr. Timothy, The Black Tower,   The School of Night, and Roosevelt's Beast, and they have been translated into 11 languages.

His novel The Pale Blue Eye was adapted into a film of the same name, and released in January of 2023.

Biography
Bayard was born on November 30, 1963, in Albuquerque, New Mexico, and grew up in Northern Virginia. He graduated from Princeton University and received a master's degree in journalism from Northwestern University. He lives in Washington, D.C., and teaches fiction writing at George Washington University.

He was a staffer at the U.S. House of Representatives, working for Delegate Eleanor Holmes Norton (D-D.C.) and as press secretary for then Representative Phil Sharp (D-Indiana).

Career
Bayard's first two novels, Fool's Errand (1999) and Endangered Species (2001), were romantic comedies with modern settings. His third novel, Mr. Timothy, published by HarperCollins, was a Victorian thriller featuring a grown-up Tiny Tim from Dickens' A Christmas Carol. Bayard's novel was a New York Times Notable book and was chosen one of the 10 best books of the year by People magazine. His 2006 novel The Pale Blue Eye is a murder mystery set at West Point in 1830, where the young Edgar Allan Poe was a cadet. The book was nominated for an Edgar  (2007) and a Dagger. It was optioned for a film adaptation by writer-director Scott Cooper. Bayard's fifth novel, The Black Tower (Morrow), set in Paris in 1818, follows the real-life detective Eugène François Vidocq as he investigates the mystery surrounding Marie Antoinette's son. His novel The School of Night (2010) shuttles between modern-day Washington, D.C., and Elizabethan England, where a group of scholars including Walter Ralegh, Christopher Marlowe, and the scientist Thomas Harriot explore dangerous questions. Roosevelt's Beast was published on March 18, 2014. It tells of an action adventure involving Theodore Roosevelt and his son, Kermit, through Brazil's Da Dúvida River circa 1914. 

Bayard has also written book reviews and essays for The Washington Post, The New York Times, Salon and Nerve. He has appeared at the National Book Festival, and he has written the New York Times recaps for Downton Abbey and Wolf Hall.

Novels

References

American historical novelists
Living people
1963 births
Princeton University alumni
Medill School of Journalism alumni
George Washington University faculty
Writers from Albuquerque, New Mexico
Novelists from Virginia
Writers from Washington, D.C.
Employees of the United States House of Representatives
American gay writers
American male novelists